Kolaković is a surname. Notable people with the surname include:

 Aleksa Kolaković, handball player
 Azra Kolaković, Bosniak singer
 Božidar Kolaković, Yugoslav footballer
 Igor Kolaković, volleyball player
 Marko Kolaković, footballer
 Miloš Kolaković, Serbian footballer

Serbian surnames